Lankaran State University is a public university located in Lankaran, Azerbaijan. In 1991 it began to operate as a branch of Baku State University, and in 1992 it received a status of an independent state university.

The university has about 1500 undergraduate and 100 graduates students. Out of the 250 professors working at the university, 150 are Candidates of Science

Departments and Institutes 
 The Humanities and Pedagogical Sciences
 Azerbaijan Linguistics and Literature
 History and Philosophy
 Pedagogics and Psychology
 Physical Education and Preparation of Youth Pre-military Training
 Foreign Languages
 Nature Sciences
 Physics-Mathematics
 Chemistry-Biology
 Geography-Ecology
 Public Defence
 Economics
 Economics and Agrotechnology
 Economical Analysis and Management
 Information Technologies
 Tourism and Hospitality

References

External links
Official website of Lankaran State University

 
Universities in Azerbaijan
1992 establishments in Azerbaijan
Educational institutions established in 1992